Wollaston Lake Airport  is located adjacent to Wollaston Lake, Saskatchewan, Canada on the Hatchet Lake Dene Nation.

The airport consists of one runway (17/35) and a single apron.

Transwest Air maintained a terminal, a fuel tank and a hangar at the airport. Pronto Airways maintains a terminal.

Airlines and destinations
Charter air service was provided by Transwest Air's (Piper PA-31 Navajo based in Wollaston Lake), West Wind Aviation, Osprey Wings and Courtesy Air.

See also
List of airports in Saskatchewan

References

External links

Certified airports in Saskatchewan